USS Hobcaw (SP-252) was a United States Navy patrol vessel, towing boat, and ferryboat in commission from 1917 to 1918.

Hobcaw was built as a civilian motorboat of the same name in 1907 by L. B. Newman at Long Branch, New Jersey. The U.S. Navy acquired her from her owner, B. M. Baruche of New York City, on 27 August 1917 for World War I service as a patrol vessel. She was commissioned as USS Hobcaw (SP-252) on 10 September 1917 at Georgetown, South Carolina.

Assigned to the 6th Naval District and based at Charleston, South Carolina, for section patrol duties, Hobcaw performed harbor patrol in Winyah Bay on the South Carolina coast until transferred to Marine Corps Recruit Depot Parris Island at Parris Island, South Carolina. Arriving there on 1 August 1918, Hobcaw acted as a towing boat and carried passengers until entering the Charleston Navy Yard at Charleston for repairs on 19 September 1918.

On week after the end of World War I, Hobcaw was returned to Baruche on 18 November 1918.

References

Department of the Navy: Navy History and Heritage Command: Online Library of Selected Images: Civilian Ships: Hobcaw (American Motor Boat, 1907). Served as USS Hobcaw (SP-252) in 1917-1918
NavSource Online: Section Patrol Craft Photo Archive: Hobcaw (SP 252)

Patrol vessels of the United States Navy
World War I patrol vessels of the United States
World War I auxiliary ships of the United States
Ships built in New Jersey
1907 ships